Some of major and minor railway stations in Nalanda district of  Bihar state.

B

 Bihar Sharif Junction railway station

C

 Chandi railway station

D

 Daniyawan railway station

E

 Ekangarsarai railway station

H

 Harnaut railway station
 Hilsa railway station

I

 Islampur railway station

N

Nalanda railway station

R

 Rajgir railway station